Granby is a city in Newton County, Missouri, United States. The population was 2,134 at the 2010 census. It is part of the Joplin, Missouri Metropolitan Statistical Area.

History
A post office called Granby has been in operation since 1856. The community took its name from Granby, Massachusetts,

Mining historically was the chief industrial activity at Granby. At the turn of the 20th century, Granby contained a large smelter owned by Henry Taylor Blow.

Geography

There are virtually no chat piles left in Granby today as evidence of the boom of lead and zinc mining as part of the Tri-State district back in the early 20th century.

Demographics

2010 census
As of the census of 2010, there were 2,134 people, 821 households, and 573 families living in the city. The racial makeup of the city was 92.5% White, 0.3% African American, 2.8% Native American, 1.1% Asian, 0.6% from other races, and 2.8% from two or more races. Hispanic or Latino of any race were 1.7% of the population.

There were 821 households, of which 36.4% had children under the age of 18 living with them, 48.0% were married couples living together, 15.8% had a female householder with no husband present, 6.0% had a male householder with no wife present, and 30.2% were non-families. 27.4% of all households were made up of individuals, and 11.5% had someone living alone who was 65 years of age or older. The average household size was 2.54 and the average family size was 3.05.

The median age in the city was 36 years. 28% of residents were under the age of 18; 9.2% were between the ages of 18 and 24; 23.2% were from 25 to 44; 24.4% were from 45 to 64; and 15.3% were 65 years of age or older. The gender makeup of the city was 48.8% male and 51.2% female.

2000 census
As of the census of 2000, there were 2,121 people, 850 households, and 589 families living in the city. The population density was 478.1 people per square mile (184.4/km2). There were 934 housing units at an average density of 210.5 per square mile (81.2/km2). The racial makeup of the city was 95.57% White, 2.03% Native American, 0.14% Asian, 0.14% Pacific Islander, 0.52% from other races, and 1.60% from two or more races. Hispanic or Latino of any race were 0.94% of the population.

There were 850 households, out of which 31.5% had children under the age of 18 living with them, 51.4% were married couples living together, 13.1% had a female householder with no husband present, and 30.6% were non-families. 27.1% of all households were made up of individuals, and 13.3% had someone living alone who was 65 years of age or older. The average household size was 2.44 and the average family size was 2.93.

In the city the population was spread out, with 65.6% under the age of 18, 9.8% from 18 to 24, 26.8% from 25 to 44, 22.2% from 45 to 64, and 15.7% who were 65 years of age or older. The median age was 36 years. For every 100 females, there were 88.2 males. For every 100 females age 18 and over, there were 81.2 males.

The median income for a household in the city was $28,625, and the median income for a family was $32,455. Males had a median income of $26,515 versus $18,208 for females. The per capita income for the city was $13,371. About 13.0% of families and 16.1% of the population were below the poverty line, including 21.9% of those under age 18 and 17.3% of those age 65 or over.

References

External links
Granby Economic Development Committee
 Historic maps of Granby in the Sanborn Maps of Missouri Collection at the University of Missouri

Cities in Newton County, Missouri
Joplin, Missouri, metropolitan area
Cities in Missouri